In abstract algebra, a commutant-associative algebra is a nonassociative algebra over a field whose multiplication satisfies the following axiom:

,

where [A, B] = AB − BA is the commutator of A and B and
(A, B, C) = (AB)C – A(BC) is the associator of A, B and C.

In other words, an algebra M is commutant-associative if the commutant, i.e. the subalgebra of M generated by all commutators [A, B], is an associative algebra.

See also
 Valya algebra
 Malcev algebra
 Alternative algebra

References
 A. Elduque,  H. C. Myung Mutations of alternative algebras,  Kluwer Academic Publishers, Boston, 1994, 
 
 M.V. Karasev, V.P. Maslov, Nonlinear Poisson Brackets: Geometry and Quantization. American Mathematical Society, Providence, 1993.
 A.G. Kurosh, Lectures on general algebra. Translated from the Russian edition (Moscow, 1960) by K. A. Hirsch. Chelsea, New York, 1963. 335 pp.    
 A.G. Kurosh, General algebra. Lectures for the academic year 1969/70. Nauka, Moscow,1974.  (In Russian)
 A.I. Mal'tsev, Algebraic systems. Springer, 1973.  (Translated from Russian)
 A.I. Mal'tsev,  Analytic loops.  Mat. Sb., 36 : 3  (1955)  pp. 569–576  (In Russian)

 V.E. Tarasov, "Quantum dissipative systems: IV. Analogues of Lie algebras and groups" Theoretical and Mathematical Physics. Vol.110. No.2. (1997) pp.168-178. 
 V.E. Tarasov Quantum Mechanics of Non-Hamiltonian and Dissipative Systems. Elsevier Science, Amsterdam, Boston, London, New York, 2008.  

Non-associative algebras